The Ta'ang National Party (abbreviated TNP), also known as the Ta'arng (Palaung) National Party, is a political party in Myanmar (Burma). The party was founded on 24 May 2010 to contest the 2010 general election, but did not participate in the 2012 by-election. The party seeks to represent the Ta'ang people (also known as the Palaung people) in the parliament of Myanmar.

References

Political parties in Myanmar
Political parties established in 2010
2010 establishments in Myanmar